Foulridge is a civil parish in Pendle, Lancashire, England.  It contains 18 listed buildings that are recorded in the National Heritage List for England.  Of these, two are at Grade II*, the middle grade, and the others are at Grade II, the lowest grade.  The parish contains the village of Foulridge, and is otherwise rural.  Most of the listed buildings are houses, farmhouses, and farm buildings.  The Leeds and Liverpool Canal runs through the parish where it enters the Foulridge Tunnel.  The entrance to the tunnel is listed, as are three bridges crossing the canal, and other structures associated with it.

Key

Buildings

Notes and references

Notes

Citations

Sources

Lists of listed buildings in Lancashire
Buildings and structures in the Borough of Pendle